Bonito Boats, Inc. v. Thunder Craft Boats, Inc., 489 U.S. 141 (1989), is a decision of the United States Supreme Court holding a state anti-plug molding law preempted because it partially duplicated and therefore interfered with the balance Congress had struck by federal patent law. The decision reaffirmed the Supreme Court's earlier decision in Sears, Roebuck & Co. v. Stiffel Co. (1964), which held a state unfair competition law preempted on the same ground.

Background
Bonito Boats developed a hull design for a fiberglass recreational boat and marketed it as the "Bonito 5VBR." The manufacturing process involved creating a hardwood model that was then sprayed with fiberglass to create a mold. The mold then served to produce the finished fiberglass boats for sale. No patent application was filed to protect the utilitarian or design aspects of the hull or the manufacturing process by which the finished boats were produced.

After the Bonito 5VBR had been on the market for six years, the Florida Legislature enacted a "plug molding" statute that prohibits the use of a direct molding process to duplicate unpatented boat hulls, and forbids the knowing sale of hulls so duplicated. Bonito Boats then filed an action in a Florida Circuit Court, alleging that Thunder Craft Boats had violated the statute by using the direct molding process to duplicate the Bonito 5VBR fiberglass hull and by knowingly selling such duplicates. Bonito Boats sought damages, injunctive relief, and an award of attorney's fees under the Florida law.

The Circuit Court granted Thunder Craft's s motion to dismiss the complaint on the ground that the statute conflicted with federal patent law, and was therefore invalid under the Supremacy Clause of the Federal Constitution. The Florida Court of Appeals and the Florida Supreme Court affirmed.

The Federal Circuit had reached a contrary result in Interpart Corp. v. Italia, upholding  a California law prohibiting plug molding. The Supreme Court granted certiorari to resolve the conflict.

Opinion of the Court
In a unanimous opinion for the Court, Justice O'Connor began by noting:

This concern continued, and federal patent law ever since has been concerned with "the difficult business 'of drawing a line between the things which are worth to the public the embarrassment of an exclusive patent, and those which are not.'" This balance is reflected in the statutory line drawing as to the required degrees of novelty and nonobviousness for issuance of a patent:

These novelty and nonobviousness requirements of patentability "embody a congressional understanding . . . that free exploitation of ideas will be the rule, to which the protection of a federal patent is the exception." Accordingly, a parallel state law system could disturb the balance Congress struck" "State law protection for techniques and designs whose disclosure has already been induced by market rewards may conflict with the very purpose of the patent laws by decreasing the range of ideas available as the building blocks of further innovation." Accordingly, "the federal patent laws must determine not only what is protected, but also what is free for all to use."

Thus, as such past decisions as Sears and Compco "have made clear that state regulation of intellectual property must yield to the extent that it clashes with the balance struck by Congress in our patent laws." And: "Where it is clear how the patent laws strike that balance in a particular circumstance, that is not a judgment the States may 
second-guess." The prior Supreme Court decisions "correctly concluded that the States may not offer patent-like protection to intellectual creations which would otherwise remain unprotected as a matter of federal law."

The Federal Circuit, in its Interpart opinion argued that a plug-molding statute "prevents unscrupulous competitors" from taking advantage of the work of the originator while leaving later comers free to design and manufacture their own products, and "the patent laws say nothing about the right to copy or the right to use, they speak only in terms of the right to exclude." The Court found this reasoning "defective."

First: "Appending the conclusionary label 'unscrupulous' to such competitive behavior merely endorses a policy judgment which the patent laws do not leave the States free to make." That decision is left to the federal government and its determination was that copying the functional attributes of unpatented products that are in general circulation "is legitimate competitive activity."

Second, as for the Federal Circuit's proposition that the patent laws say "nothing about the right to copy or the right to use," there is a federal right to copy and the Federal Circuit's "assertion to the contrary is puzzling, and flies in the face" of decisions interpreting Sears and Compco. Those cases require that "copying of the article itself that is unprotected by the federal patent and copyright laws cannot be protected by state law."

This is a field that Congress has fully occupied, leaving no room for parallel state regulation, whether conflicting, complementary, or supplemental:

Impact and subsequent developments
In 1998, Congress subsequently enacted the Vessel Hull Design Protection Act (VHDPA) as part of the Digital Millennium Copyright Act, providing copyright-like or sui generis protection to boat hull designs, under a registration system something like that of the Semiconductor Chip Protection Act (SCPA). This law creates ten years of copyright-like protection for boat hull designs.

The VHDPA was too late for Bonito Boats, however. According to the U.S. Coast Guard, Bonito Boats went out of business on July 16, 1991.

See also
 List of United States Supreme Court cases, volume 489
 List of United States Supreme Court cases
 Lists of United States Supreme Court cases by volume
 List of United States Supreme Court cases by the Rehnquist Court

References

External links
 

United States Supreme Court cases
United States Supreme Court cases of the Rehnquist Court
United States patent case law
United States federal preemption law
1989 in United States case law